Helcystogramma lochistis is a moth in the family Gelechiidae. It was described by Edward Meyrick in 1911. Its range includes India and Sri Lanka.

The wingspan is 12–13 mm. The forewings are rather dark fuscous, faintly purple tinged. The stigmata is cloudy, blackish, with the plical beneath the first discal, larger, suffused, preceded by some white scales. There is a pale whitish-ochreous spot on the costa at three-fourths and a terminal series of indistinct dark fuscous dots. The hindwings are grey.

References

Moths described in 1911
lochistis
Moths of Asia